Four Letter Word may refer to:

 Four-letter word, a set of English-language words written with four letters which are considered profane

Music
 "Four Letter Word" (Beady Eye song), 2011
 "Four Letter Word" (Def Leppard song), 2003
 "Four Letter Word" (Kim Wilde song), 1988
 "Four Letter Word", by Cheap Trick from One on One
 "Four Letter Word", by Jessie J from R.O.S.E.
 "Four Letter Word", by Uncle Kracker from Midnight Special
 "Four-Letter Words", written by Margo Guryan, sung by Miriam Makeba on All About Miriam 1966
 "Four Letter Words", by Suzi Quatro from Suzi ... and Other Four Letter Words

Other uses
Four Letter Words, a 2000 film directed by Sean Baker